Bavagnoli is an Italian surname. Notable people with the surname include:

Elisabetta Bavagnoli (born 1963), Italian footballer and manager
Gaetano Bavagnoli (1879–1933), Italian conductor

Italian-language surnames